The Santa Monica College of Design, Art and Architecture existed in Santa Monica, California from 1990 until 2000.  The director of the school was Joan Abrahamson who is a MacArthur Fellow and the founder and president of the Jefferson Institute.  The school hosted an all professional faculty of working artists, designers and architects, among them Alison Saar, Laddie John Dill, George Herms, Jill Giegerich, Lisa Adams, Peter Alexander, Robert Wilhite and others.

Design schools in the United States
Art schools in California
Universities and colleges in Los Angeles County, California
Defunct private universities and colleges in California
Educational institutions established in 1990
Educational institutions disestablished in 2000
1990 establishments in California
2000 disestablishments in California